Poitiers Cathedral is a Roman Catholic church in Poitiers, France. It is the seat of the Archbishop  of Poitiers.

History
Its construction began in 1162 by Henry II of England and Eleanor of Aquitaine on the ruins of a Roman basilica, and work was well advanced by the end of the 12th century. It is the largest medieval monument in the city of Poitiers.

Architecture

It is the best known example of a hall church of the Angevin Gothic style. It consists of a nave flanked on either side by two aisles. The nave and aisles are almost equal in height and width, all three of which decrease towards the west, thus enhancing the perspective. The exterior generally has a heavy appearance.

Most of the windows of the choir and the transepts preserve their stained glass of the 12th and 13th centuries; the end window, the Crucifixion Window contains the figures of Henry II and Eleanor.  It was completed in about 1165, making it one of the earliest stained-glass cathedral windows in France.  The choir stalls, carved between 1235 and 1257, are also among the oldest in France.

Organ

On the night of 25 December 1681,← the organ was destroyed by fire. It was not until 1770-78 that a campaign was launched to build a replacement. François-Henri Clicquot, at that time the leading organ-builder in France, was appointed to undertake the work but died on Pentecost 1790 before completing the work. His son, Claude-François Clicquot, finished the job, handing it over for presentation in March 1791. The instrument is a beautiful example of eighteenth-century organ design, and is still largely intact.

References

External links
 Cathedral exterior, and external view of one of the numerous churches in Poitiers
 Cathedral interior
 *

See also

List of Gothic Cathedrals in Europe

Poitiers
Roman Catholic churches in Poitiers
Basilica churches in France